Suomen hauskin tavis is a Finnish comedy program. The program is hosted by Elina Kottonen. The program started in 2017.

References 

Finnish television shows
Finnish comedy television series
2017 Finnish television series debuts
Nelonen original programming